Souvenir is the second album by indie pop band Pop Etc under their new name. Including their albums as the Morning Benders, it is the band's fourth album. The album was self-released on January 29, 2016. The album contained their first single to chart, "What Am I Becoming?" which reached 33 on the US Alternative Songs chart.

Track listing

References 

2016 albums
Self-released albums